The Alyssontini are a small tribe of small Bembicine wasps.

References 

Crabronidae
Hymenoptera tribes
Biological pest control wasps